The Institution of Chemical Engineers (IChemE) is a global professional engineering institution with over 33,000 members worldwide. It was  founded in 1922 and awarded a Royal Charter in 1957.

It has offices in Rugby, London, Melbourne, Wellington, New Zealand, Kuala Lumpur, and Singapore.

History
In 1881, George E. Davis proposed the formation of a Society of Chemical Engineers, but instead the Society of Chemical Industry (SCI) was formed.

The First World War required a huge increase in chemical production to meet the needs of the munitions and its supply industries, including a twenty-fold increase in explosives.  This brought a number of chemical engineers into high positions within the Ministry of Munitions, notably K. B. Quinan, Frederic Nathan and Arthur Duckham.

The increased public perception of chemical engineers renewed the interest in a society, and in 1918 John Hinchley, who was a Council Member of the SCI, petitioned it to form a Chemical Engineers Group (CEG), which was done, with him as chairman and 510 members. In 1920 this group voted to form a separate Institution of Chemical Engineers,which was achieved in 1922 with Hinchley as the Secretary, a role he held until his death. The inaugural meeting was held on 2 May 1922, at the Hotel Cecil, London.

Despite opposition from the Institute of Chemistry and the Institution of Civil Engineers, it was formally incorporated with the Board of Trade on 21 December 1922 as a company not for profit and limited by guarantee. The first Corporate meeting was held 14 March 1923 and the first Annual General Meeting on 8 June 1923: Arthur Duckham was confirmed as President, Hinchley as Secretary and Quinan as Vice-President.  At this time it had about 200 members.  Nathan was the second President in 1925.

The American Institute of Chemical Engineers, which had been founded in 1908, served as a useful model. While suggestions of amalgamation were made and there was friendly but limited contact, the two organisations developed independently.

In 1926 an official Seal of the Institution was produced by Edith Mary Hinchley, wife of John Hinchley.

The same year the Institution set the first examinations for Associate (i.e. professionally qualified) membership, bringing it into line with the Civil and Mechanical Institutions. In addition to four set examinations of three hours each, there was a 'Home Paper' requiring the candidate to gather information and data and design a chemical plant, accompanied by drawings and a written design proposal within a time limit of a month.

In 1938 the membership passed 1000.

In 1939 the first courses were recognised as granting exemption from the examinations for Associate Membership, being Manchester College of Technology and of the South Wales and Monmouthshire School of Mines.  Others followed in subsequent years.

In 1942 Mrs Hilda Derrick (née Stroud) was the first female member, in the category Student, taking a correspondence course in chemical engineering during the war.  She was active in promoting the Institution and profession to women.

In 1955 Canterbury University College, New Zealand,  and University of Cape Town, South Africa, were the first overseas institutions to have their qualifications recognised.

On 8 April 1957 the IChemE was granted a Royal Charter, changing it from a limited company to a body incorporated by Royal Charter, a professional institution like the Civil and Mechanical ones, with HRH Prince Philip, Duke of Edinburgh as patron, a role he continued for over 63 years.

In 1971, the membership grades were changed: Associate became Member and Member became Fellow.

In 1976 the Institution moved its Headquarters from London to Rugby.

Relations with Other Bodies

The IChemE is licensed by the Engineering Council UK to assess candidates for inclusion on ECUK's Register of professional Engineers, giving the status of Chartered Engineer, Incorporated Engineer and Engineering Technician. It is licensed by the Science Council to grant the status of Chartered Scientist and Registered Science Technician. It is licensed by the Society for the Environment to grant the status of Chartered Environmentalist. It is a member of the European Federation of Chemical Engineering. It accredits chemical engineering degree courses in 25 countries worldwide.

Function
"Promoting and advancing the science of chemical engineering in all its branches, promoting competence and a commitment to sustainable development, advancing the discipline for the benefit of society and supporting the professional development of members."

Membership grades and post-nominals
IChemE has two main types of membership, qualified and non-qualified, with the technician member grade being available in both categories.

Qualified membership grades.

Fellow – A chemical engineering professional in a very senior position in industry and/or academia. Entitling the holder to the post-nominal FIChemE and is a chartered grade encompassing all the privileges of Chartered Member grade.

Chartered Member – Internationally recognised level of professional and academic competence requiring at least 4 years of field experience and a bachelors degree with honours. Entitles the holder to the post-nominal MIChemE and registration as one or a combination of; Chartered Engineer (CEng), Chartered Scientist (CSci) and Chartered Environmentalist (CEnv). This also entitles the individual to register as a European Engineer with the pre-nominal Eur Ing.

Associate Member – This grade is for young professionals who are qualified in chemical & process engineering to bachelors with honours level or a higher. Typically this is the grade held by those working towards Chartered Member level or those graduates working other fields. This grade entitles the holder to the post-nominal AMIChemE. This grade can also lead to the grade of Incorporated Engineer (IEng) for those with some field experience but which falls short of the level required for Chartered Member grade.

Technician Member – Uses practical understanding to solve engineering problems and could have a qualification, an apprenticeship or years of experience. This grade can lead to the Eng Tech TIChemE post-nominal and now in conjunction with the Nuclear Institute the post-nominal Eng Tech TIChemE TNucI.

Non-qualified membership grades.

Associate Fellow – Senior professionals trained in other fields of a level comparable to Fellow in other professional bodies.

Affiliate – For people working in, with or with a general interest in the sector.

Student – For undergraduate chemical & process engineering students.

Activities

Medals

The Institution has been awarding Medals for different areas of Chemical engineering work since the first Moulton medals were issued in 1929. The medal was named after Lord Moulton who helped develop chemical engineering during World War I when he took charge of explosive supplies. Today the institution gives out eleven medals related to research and teaching, six medals in special interest groups, four medals relating to publications, two medals for services to the profession<ref>{{cite web|url=https://www.icheme.org/knowledge/medals-and-prizes/services-to-the-profession/|title=Services to the profession|website=IChemE|access-date=17 April 2021}}</ref> and two medals for contribution to the Institution.

 Annual awards 

The IChemE Innovation and Excellence Awards take place in November in the UK. The awards are highly regarded throughout the process industries for recognising and rewarding chemical engineering excellence and innovation. The first awards took place at the National Motorcycle Museum in Birmingham on 23 March 1994.

There are 14 categories in total that applicants are invited to enter including; food and drink, energy, health and safety, bioprocessing, innovative product, nuclear innovation and young chemical engineer of the year, offering a broad scope for entries.

The organisation is working on newer award programs in other countries and in 2012 events also took place in Singapore and North America.

 Ashok Kumar Fellowship 
The Ashok Kumar Fellowship is an opportunity for a graduate to spend three months working at the UK Parliamentary Office for Science and Technology (POST). The fellowship was jointly funded by the IChemE and the Northeast of England Process Industry Cluster (NEPIC). However, NEPIC was unable to contribute in 2018 and the Fellowship was not offered in 2019.  As of 2021 it is jointly funded by the IChemE and the Materials Processing Institute (reflecting Kumar's employment with British Steel).

The Fellowship was set up in memory of Dr Ashok Kumar, the only serving chemical engineer in the Parliament of the United Kingdom at the time of his sudden death in 2010. Kumar was an IChemE Fellow who had been the Labour MP for Middlesbrough South and Cleveland East.

 Whynotchemeng? 
In response to a considerable reduction in applications to study the subject at UK universities in 2000 the IChemE established an educational programme and website whynotchemeng?'' to help young people find out more about a career in the field of chemical engineering.  This was credited with the major rise in applications in the following years. 
The programme included a website, YouTube stream, documents and outreach volunteers. In 2018 the web resource was moved from its own site to one within the IChemE.

ChemEng Evolution 
In order to celebrate its centenary, in 2022 the Institution produced a website with short articles about historic matters in the history of chemical engineering and of the IChemE and to host videos and webinars during the year. ChemEng Evolution

Coat of arms 
The coat of arms is a shield with two figures. On the left a helmeted woman, Pallas Athene, the goddess of wisdom, and on the right, a bearded man with a large hammer, Hephaestus the god of technology and of fire. The shield itself shows a salamander as the symbol of chemistry, and a corn grinding mill as a symbol of continuous processes. Between these is a diagonal stripe in red and blue in steps to indicate the cascade nature of many chemical engineering processes. The shield is surmounted by helmet on which is a dolphin, which is in heraldry associated with intellectual activity, and also represents the importance of fluid mechanics. Just below the dolphin are two Integral signs to illustrate the necessity of mathematics and in particular calculus.

The Latin motto is "Findendo Fingere Disco" or "I learn to make by separating".

Publications

Peer-reviewed journals 
 Chemical Engineering Research and Design
 Process Safety and Environmental Protection
 Food and Bioproducts Processing
 Education for Chemical Engineers
 Molecular Systems Design and Engineering (joint with the Royal Society of Chemistry)
 Sustainable Production and Consumption
 South African Journal of Chemical Engineering

Other periodicals 
 The Chemical Engineer
 Loss Prevention Bulletin

Books 
 Conference Proceedings
 Technical Guides
 Safety Books
 Forms of Contract

Past presidents

Notable members 
 Roland Clift Developer of Life cycle assessment and broadcaster on environmental issues
 John Coulson (1910–1990) Co-writer of classic UK textbooks
 M. B. Donald (1897 - 1978) Fourth Ramsay professor of Chemical engineering at University College London. Former honorary secretary and vice-president of IChemE, Institution's Donald medal named after him. 
 Sir Arthur Duckham (1879–1932) First President of the IChemE
 Ian Fells Noted energy expert and popular science broadcaster
 Trevor Kletz (1922-2013) Noted safety expert
 Ashok Kumar (1956–2010) UK Member of Parliament
 Frank Lees (1931–1999) author of major safety encyclopaedia
 Bodo Linnhoff His 1979 PhD thesis led to Pinch Technology which has enabled companies to save large amounts of energy
 K. B. Quinan (1878–1958) An American who, according to Lloyd George "did more than any other single individual to win the (First World) War" 
 Jack Richardson (1929–2011) Co-writer of classic UK textbooks
 P. N. Rowe (1919-2014) Fifth Ramsay professor of chemical engineering at University College London. He was president of the Institution between 1981 and 1982.
 Meredith Thring (1915–2006) prolific inventor, futurologist and early proponent of sustainability

See also 

 Chartered engineer
 Incorporated engineer
 Royal Society of Chemistry
 American Institute of Chemical Engineers (AIChE)
 Chemical engineer
 Chemical engineering
 History of chemical engineering
 List of chemical engineers
 List of chemical engineering societies
 Process engineering
 Process design (chemical engineering)
 Frank Morton Sports Day
 Northeast of England Process Industry Cluster

References

External links 
 Institution of Chemical Engineers
 Origins of the IChemE
 Why not Chemical Engineering – schools' website
 Official IChemE Twitter feed
 ChemEng Evolution

 
Chemical engineering organizations
Chemical industry in the United Kingdom
ECUK Licensed Members
Engineering societies based in the United Kingdom
Organisations based in Warwickshire
Organizations established in 1922
Rugby, Warwickshire
Science and technology in Warwickshire
1922 establishments in the United Kingdom